This is a list of Nigerian films released in 2005.

Films

See also
List of Nigerian films

References

External links
2005 films at the Internet Movie Database

2005
Nigeria
Films
List